Laurie Menviel or L. Menviel; Laurie Menviel is a palaeoclimatologist, and a Scientia fellow, at the University of New South Wales, who was awarded a Dorothy Hill Medal in 2019.

Career and education 
Menviel was awarded a Masters of Geochemistry at the University of Aix-Marseilee, France, in 2002, and then a PhD in Chemical Oceanography at the University of Hawaii, in 2008.

Menviel's research includes studies on ocean circulation, the carbon cycle and paleoceanography. She has published on ocean circulation, the variability of ocean circulation and the impact of this variability on planetary climate, as well as carbon cycles, as well as on the cryosphere. Menviel has published on earth science, including the role of ocean circulation on both the future and past climate changes, particularly abrupt changes. She has also worked on evaluating the impact of changes in the circulation of the ocean, and how this influences the carbon cycle, as well as the Antarctic ice sheet, and it's stability and variability.

Menviel is the editor and co-editor in chief of the journal Climate of the Past. She was awarded an Australian Research Council, DECRA award, and is a researcher at the Climate Change Research Centre, at the University of New South Wales.

Publications 
Select publications include the following.

 Yu J; Menviel L; Jin ZD; Anderson RF; Jian Z; Piotrowski AM; Ma X; Rohling EJ; Zhang F; Marino G; McManus JF, (2020), 'Last glacial atmospheric CO2 decline due to widespread Pacific deep-water expansion', Nature Geoscience, vol. 13, pp. 628 - 633, 
 Menviel LC; Skinner LC; Tarasov L; Tzedakis PC, (2020), 'An ice–climate oscillatory framework for Dansgaard–Oeschger cycles', Nature Reviews Earth and Environment, vol. 1, pp. 677 - 693, 
 Yu J; Menviel L; Jin ZD; Thornalley DJR; Foster GL; Rohling EJ; McCave IN; McManus JF; Dai Y; Ren H; He F; Zhang F; Chen PJ; Roberts AP, (2019), 'More efficient North Atlantic carbon pump during the Last Glacial Maximum', Nature Communications, vol. 10, pp. 2170, 
 Menviel L, (2019), 'The southern amplifier', Science, vol. 363, pp. 1040 - 1041, 
 Menviel L; Spence P; Yu J; Chamberlain MA; Matear RJ; Meissner KJ; England MH, (2018), 'Southern Hemisphere westerlies as a driver of the early deglacial atmospheric CO2 rise', Nature Communications, vol. 9,

Media 
Menviel's work on climate and the ocean, including research published in Nature Communications, has been reported in various media sources including describing what 'carbon pollution' is, in The Conversation. Her work has described the impact of climate change on westerly winds in the Southern Ocean. She commented,"...it is vital to bring more observational networks into the Southern Ocean to monitor these changes. We need a clear warning if we are approaching a point in our climate system where we may see a spike in atmospheric carbon dioxide and the rapid temperature rise that inevitably follows."

Recognition 

 2019 – Dorothy Hill Medal from Australian Academy of Science.

References

External links 

 CCRC Webpage
 Science.Org.au

Living people
Australian women scientists
Year of birth missing (living people)
Aix-Marseille University alumni
University of Hawaiʻi alumni
Academic staff of the University of New South Wales
Climatologists